Sadiria is a genus of flowering plants belonging to the family Primulaceae.

Its native range is Eastern Himalaya to Southern Central China and Northern Myanmar.

Species
Species:

Sadiria aberrans 
Sadiria erecta 
Sadiria eugeniifolia 
Sadiria griffithii 
Sadiria longistyla 
Sadiria subsessilifolia 
Sadiria yingjiangensis

References

Primulaceae
Primulaceae genera